The Calumet Baking Powder Company was an American food company established in 1889 in Chicago, Illinois, by salesman William Monroe Wright to manufacture baking powder. Calumet operated independently until it was acquired by General Foods in 1929.

Currently, Calumet is a brand owned by Kraft Heinz which baking powder is produced by its division, Kraft Foods.

Overview 

His newly formulated double-acting baking powder took its name from the French-derived, colonial-era word for a Native American ceremonial pipe, given to the lands now known as Calumet City, Illinois. Wright's company adopted a stylized Indian wearing a war bonnet as its trademark. The new baking powder formula replaced cream of tartar with aluminum phosphate and also included dried egg whites. This formula was created by Wright with the help of chemist George Campbell Rew.

In 1929, William Wright sold out to General Foods and the "Calumet" baking powder became one of its many name brands. Wright, a fan of horse racing, would use his wealth to build what would become a world-renowned horse breeding and training operation in Lexington, Kentucky, which he named Calumet Farm. It was later run by his son, Warren Wright. General Foods merged to Kraft Foods Inc. in 1990 so Calumet was added to the Kraft Foods' brand portfolio.

Cans of Calumet Baking Powder were used as props in the larder scenes of the 1980 film, The Shining. This detail is noted early in the 2012 documentary Room 237, as the catalyst for Bill Blakemore's theory that the film is an allegory for European settlers' genocide of Native Americans.

References

External links

 

1889 establishments in Illinois
1929 disestablishments in Illinois
Baking powder
American companies established in 1889
Food and drink companies disestablished in 1929
Defunct companies based in Chicago
Food manufacturers of the United States
History of Chicago
Kraft Foods brands
Manufacturing companies based in Chicago
Food and drink companies established in 1889
General Foods